Dance Moms is an American reality television series that debuted on Lifetime on July 13, 2011. Created by Collins Avenue Productions, the show follows the training and careers of children in dance and show business under the tutelage of Abby Lee Miller as well as the relationships between Miller, the dancers, and their often bickering mothers. Set originally in Pittsburgh, Pennsylvania, and later in Los Angeles, California, the show is primarily filmed at the Abby Lee Dance Company (ALDC) studios. The show follows the girls on the ALDC Junior Elite Competition Team as they learn their dances and then compete them at dance competitions all across the country.

Synopsis 
Primarily set in Pittsburgh, Pennsylvania and later in Los Angeles, California, the show originally followed the Abby Lee Dance Company's Junior Elite Competition Team of dancers aged 6–16 as they traveled week-to-week to various dance competitions, winning awards and preparing for Nationals, while at the same time being prepared by Abby Lee Miller to be "professional, employable working dancers". The series depicted the doting mothers as rivals of each other on behalf of their daughters, often arguing with Miller and each other, and sometimes closing ranks against rival teams. Dance performances were creatively conceptualized by Miller and her dance instructors, with input from the show's producers, while the choreography was done by Miller, her staff, and occasionally a guest choreographer. Various rival dance teams spurred the team's competitiveness. The show's success was often credited to the drama and conflict among Miller and the moms, along with the weekly dances and the close relationships among the girls as viewers watched them grow up and improve their skills.

The show features Miller as an extremely strict dance team coach who, over the series, relied more and more on criticism, sometimes personal, to motivate the girls, with an emphasis on hard work and competition against teammates. Every week on the show, Miller used a pyramid of individual headshots and gave feedback to each girl about her ranking, previous week's performance, attitude, effort, and the behavior of the girl herself and her mother. Miller had never used a pyramid in her studio prior to Dance Moms, and when once asked about it, Miller stated, "I've never done that in my life. That has nothing to do with me. That's the show; they came up with that whole process."

In season 5, Miller relocated the team to Los Angeles to help build her reputation in the west coast, and while the team continued weekly competitions, the focus shifted somewhat to include preparation for careers in the acting and music businesses.

During the second half of season 7, several dancers and their mothers left the ALDC to form "The Irreplaceables". Abby left the show several episodes later, followed by the remaining ALDC dancers and mothers.

In July 2018, Miller announced her return for season 8 of Dance Moms. Executive producer Bryan Stinson announced the show would be casting a whole new team, with final callbacks being in September 2018. On January 12, a new team was selected, consisting of 8 dancers. A promo for the new season was released in February, revealing that the show would be set around Miller's battle with Burkitt's Lymphoma while returning "back to her roots" with a new team. The season is set in Pittsburgh, in the same studio where the show began in 2011. Season 8 premiered on Lifetime on June 4, 2019.

Cast

Abby Lee Dance Company 
 Abby Lee Miller is the director of Reign Dance Productions (formerly Maryen Lorrain Dance Studio), which houses the Abby Lee Dance Company (ALDC), of which she is owner and chief choreographer. She left the show during season 7B in relation to pending sentencing for financial related crimes (described below), and with the cast fracturing into separate groups as part of the resulting fallout from it. She returned for season 8.
 Gianna Martello is an instructor for RDP covering all genres of dance, and is also the assistant choreographer for the ALDC Junior Elite Competition team. Martello studied dance under Miller's tutelage through Reign Dance Productions.

Seasons 1–7 cast
 Melissa Ziegler-Gisoni is the mother of Maddie Ziegler, a lyrical/contemporary and tap dancer, and Mackenzie Ziegler, an acro/hip hop dancer and singer (formerly under the stage name Mack Z) from Murrysville, Pennsylvania. Maddie was known to be Abby's favorite student during her time on the show, which caused tension between the other moms and Abby. Maddie and Mackenzie studied dance at Abby Lee Miller's studio through Reign Dance Productions from the early ages of four and two respectively. They were original cast members of the show and left during season six.
 Christi Lukasiak is the mother of Chloe Lukasiak, a lyrical/contemporary and ballet dancer from Mars, Pennsylvania. Chloe began dancing at Miller's studio at age two. They were original cast members of the show but left the show following the season four finale. They returned to guest star for the season 7A finale and season 7B before leaving the show once again following the season seven finale.
 Holly Hatcher-Frazier is the mother of Nia Frazier, a contemporary dancer and singer (under the stage name Nia Sioux), from Pittsburgh. They were original cast members of the show, and left the ALDC during season 7 to form “The Irreplaceables”. They officially departed the show following the finale.
 Kelly Hyland is the mother of Brooke Hyland, an acro/contemporary dancer and singer and Paige Hyland, an acro/jazz dancer and model from Murrysville. Kelly had been a dancer at ALDC when she was young, and was even taught by Abby herself before quitting to become a cheerleader. Brooke and Paige began dancing at Miller’s studio at age 3. The Hylands were original cast members, but left the show in the middle of season four following a physical altercation between Kelly and Abby.
 Cathy Nesbitt-Stein is the mother of Vivi-Anne Stein, a musical theatre & tap dancer from Canton, Ohio who joined the ALDC for most of season 1. Vivi-Anne was previously a student and team member at her mother's studio, Candy Apples Dance Center, where she continued her dance training after leaving the team and show. Cathy and Vivi-Anne continued to appear as recurring rivals since season two. (Also see "Rival studios" below.) Cathy is known as considered Abby's her ultimate rival.
 Jill Vertes is the mother of Kendall Vertes, a jazz/lyrical dancer, model and singer (under the stage name Kendall K) from Cranberry Township, Pennsylvania. Before joining the ALDC in season 2, Kendall studied dance at Rogers Dance in Pittsburgh and Studio 19. During season two, they switched to Candy Apples Dance Center for several episodes, but ultimately returned to the ALDC. They left the ALDC during season seven to form "The Irreplaceables", departing the show as a whole following the season.

 Leslie Ackerman is the mother of Payton Ackerman, a hip hop & contemporary dancer from Upper St. Clair, Pennsylvania. Payton began dancing with the ALDC when she was 11 years old. She joined the team as a recurring member multiple times throughout seasons 2-4. She graduated from the ALDC in 2015.
 Kristie Ray is the mother of Asia Monet Ray, a jazz/contemporary dancer and singer (under the stage name Asia Monet) from Corona, California. Asia first appeared on AUDC, where she was the youngest competitor from either season. Asia briefly danced with the Junior Elite Competition Team in season 3 and left just before Nationals.
 Kira Girard is the mother of Kalani Hilliker, a contemporary & lyrical dancer and model/fashion designer from Mesa, Arizona. Kalani appeared on season 2 of Abby's Ultimate Dance Competition (AUDC) and was brought to ALDC in season four to replace Brooke and Paige. After several weeks with the ALDC team in season four, she was made a permanent team member of the ALDC in season five. They left the ALDC during season seven to form "The Irreplaceables", and left the show following the season finale.
 Jessalynn Siwa is the mother of JoJo Siwa, a jazz/contemporary and hip hop dancer and singer from Omaha, Nebraska. Before joining the ALDC as guests in season five, Jessalynn and JoJo appeared on season two of AUDC. JoJo was brought in to replace Chloe on the ALDC team. After several episodes as a guest dancer, Jojo was made a full-time team member but left the show near the end of season 6 after signing a contract with Nickelodeon. Jessalynn and JoJo also made a guest appearance in season eight.
 Ashlee Allen is the mother of Brynn Rumfallo, a lyrical & contemporary dancer from Phoenix, Arizona. Prior to Dance Moms, Brynn previously had trained at Club Dance Studio, Arizona, like her teammate Kalani. Brynn joined the team in season 5 as a guest and then was given the opportunity to be a full-time member of the team for season six. They left the show at the end of season seven along with the other remaining ALDC members.
 Yolanda Walmsley is the mother of Elliana Walmsley, a lyrical/contemporary and ballroom dancer from Boulder, Colorado. They joined the ALDC mini team in season six, and Elliana joined the elite team in season seven. They left the show during season 7 along with the other remaining ALDC members but returned for some episodes in season eight. They were later dismissed by Abby after Yolanda caused tension between the other cast members.
 Stacey Ketchman is the mother of Lilliana Ketchman, an acro/ballet and contemporary dancer from Fayetteville, North Carolina. They joined the ALDC mini team in season six, and Lilliana joined the elite team in season seven. They left the show during season seven along with the other remaining ALDC members but returned for season eight.
 Camille Bridges is the mother of Camryn Bridges, a jazz & contemporary dancer from St. Louis, Missouri. They joined the ALDC in season 7, but later that season left with several of the other cast members to form "The Irreplaceables".
 Jaime Caes is the mother of Maesi Caes, a hip hop & contemporary dancer from Altoona, Iowa who danced with Justin Bieber in Des Moines on his Purpose World Tour. They joined the ALDC in season seven, but later that season left along with the other remaining ALDC members. Jaime and Maesi can be seen in the season eight special "The New Team", but didn't return with the team.

Season 8 cast
 Tricia Farrar is the mother of Brady Farrar, a ballet & contemporary dancer from Miami, Florida. They joined the ALDC in season 8, but later that season left after Abby's favoritism towards Brady caused tension between the mothers. They later returned to the ALDC. Brady is the first boy on the ALDC Junior Elite Competition Team.
 Ann Colin is the mother of Hannah Colin, a lyrical & contemporary dancer from New Albany, Indiana. They joined the ALDC in season 8.
 Joanne Paolantonio is the mother of GiaNina Paolantonio, a lyrical & musical theatre dancer from Oakhurst, New Jersey who played Amanda Thripp in the Broadway musical Matilda and a guest pointe ballerina in The Greatest Showman. They joined the ALDC in season 8.
 Michelle Georgiana is the mother of Sarah Georgiana, an acro & contemporary dancer from Canonsburg, Pennsylvania. They joined the ALDC in season 8, but later that season left after their loyalty to the ALDC was questioned.
 Ashley Hosbach is the mother of Pressley Hosbach, a contemporary & musical theatre dancer from Florham Park, New Jersey. They joined the ALDC in season 8.
 Erin Kristich is the mother of Savannah Kristich, a contemporary/lyrical dancer from Las Vegas, Nevada. They joined the ALDC in season 8, but later that season left after it was announced that Elliana Walmsey (Savannah's rival) was returning to the show.
 Lakisha Samuels is the mother of Paris Moore, a contemporary dancer from Jacksonville, North Carolina. They joined the ALDC in season 8 to replace Elliana.

"The Irreplaceables" 
 Cheryl Burke is the dance coach for "The Irreplaceables".
 Holly Hatcher-Frazier and her daughter Nia Frazier (aka. Nia Sioux) (See "Abby Lee Dance Company" above.)
 Christi Lukasiak and her daughter Chloe Lukasiak (See "Abby Lee Dance Company" above.)
 Jill Vertes and her daughter Kendall Vertes (See "Abby Lee Dance Company" above.)
 Kira Girard and her daughter Kalani Hilliker (See "Abby Lee Dance Company" above.)
 Camille Bridges and her daughter Camryn Bridges (See "Abby Lee Dance Company" above.)

Rival studios 
 Candy Apples Dance Center (Canton, Ohio) is owned and operated by Cathy Nesbitt-Stein, the mother of Vivi-Anne, who danced with the ALDC in season 1. The CADC has been the main rival of the ALDC throughout seasons 1–5 along with season 7. Over the five seasons of Dance Moms, show producers added several dancers who were well known in the dance competition world and/or had auditioned for Dance Moms in the past, making the "Candy Apples" a team that existed only for television (the real-life Candy Apple team ceased to be featured on the show). Partway through season 5, the CADC was completely recast for one week (see below).
 Studio Bleu Dance Center (Ashburn, Virginia) is coached by Gloria Hampton, the mother of Kaeli, who danced with the ALDC as a guest team member briefly in season 3. Studio Bleu's competition team, which the ALDC competed against several times, was portrayed as a respected and formidable opponent in several episodes.
 Murrieta Dance Project (Murrieta, California) is owned and operated by Erin Babbs, who has been an occasional guest choreographer for the CADC in seasons 4 and 5. MDP competed against the ALDC several times in season 5. In season 7, Chloe Lukasiak joined MDP and danced with the team for a short period of time before leaving MDP to join "The Irreplaceables".
 Broadway Dance Academy (Fenton, Michigan) is owned and operated by Jeanette Cota, the mother of Ava, who guest starred as part of the ALDC "Select Team" in season 4. The real BDA team competed against the ALDC several times in season 5 before leaving the show (except for Ava) to be replaced on the TV team by the four dancers from the former CADC team.
 Beginning with the start of season 5.5, BDA competed as "Candy Apples" for one week after which they resumed using their actual name. This team (consisting of Haley Huelsman, Tessa Wilkinson, Chloe Smith, Ashtin Roth and Ava) won the Overall Group competition, handing the ALDC their first Nationals loss in the group overall category.
 Studio 19 Dance Complex (Pittsburgh, Pennsylvania) is owned and operated by Tammy Croftcheck & Katie Watts. Studio 19 has been the main rival of the ALDC for Season 8.

Episodes

Awards and nominations

Controversy and criticism 
Several episodes featured controversial costume choices made by Miller, some of which were criticized by the moms, particularly Lukasiak and Frazier. Due to heavy criticism, the season 2 episode "Topless Showgirls", which aired on March 6, 2012, has been removed from rotation. The episode features the young dancers performing a burlesque-style routine and wearing sequined, flesh-toned bra tops and tights in an effort to make them appear nude. Miller defends her costume choice saying, "Everyone in the industry knows the girls are completely covered and everything's harmless." Lifetime confirmed pulling the episode. The episode is not included on the season's DVD.

Kelly Hyland was arrested in early January 2014 on charges of assaulting Miller during a dispute backstage at a dance competition held in New York City during filming for the show's fourth season in November 2013. Hyland appeared in court with Miller on January 21, 2014, and pleaded "not guilty". A hearing was scheduled for March but adjourned to May 5, 2014. Legal expert Rosemarie Arnold opined that because the episode aired on TV, Hyland's defense that the alleged assault was scripted and that the producers deliberately incited her to strike Miller was viable. On a January 29 appearance on The View, Miller announced that Hyland and her daughters Brooke and Paige Hyland were no longer contracted with and would no longer appear on Dance Moms. After the final episode of season 4, Christi and Chloe Lukasiak also left Dance Moms.

On October 13, 2015, Abby Lee Miller was indicted in Pittsburgh on charges of concealing her income from her performances on the show in 2012 and 2013. She was charged with bankruptcy fraud, concealment of bankruptcy assets and false bankruptcy declarations in hiding some $755,000. In June 2016, Miller pled guilty to the charges, and entered a plea deal with the IRS. In May 2017, Miller was sentenced to one year and a day in prison, followed by two years of supervised release. Season 7B was the last season to feature the original cast members. After filming for season 7B wrapped up, The Irreplaceables announced that they were going on tour.

On June 2, 2020, Miller posted a black square to Instagram on Blackout Tuesday in response to the murders of George Floyd and Ahmaud Arbery, and the shooting of Breonna Taylor. This caused Adriana Smith, the mother of Dance Moms season 8 dancer Kamryn, to share on Instagram that she and her daughter left the show because of their experience with Miller. "A statement from her that sticks in my mind to this day during my time on DMS8 is 'I know you grew up in the HOOD with only a box of 8 crayons, but I grew up in the Country Club with a box of 64—don't be stupid,'" Smith wrote on Instagram. The following day on June 3, 2020, another Dance Moms mother, Camille Bridges, accused Miller of treating her daughter Camryn differently because of her race and that the environment was "extremely hostile". She told E! News via e-mail that Miller "tried to spin Camryn as being the poor one and there on scholarship. She would say the most terrible things on camera. It was a traumatic experience that I wish on no one." Miller has since deleted her Black Lives Matter post and on June 4, 2020, she issued an apology to "Kamryn, Adriana, and anyone else I've hurt", saying, "I realize that racism can come not just from hate, but also from ignorance. No matter the cause, it is harmful, and it is my fault. While I cannot change the past or remove the harm I have done, I promise to educate myself, learn, grow, and do better. While I hope to one day earn your forgiveness, I recognize that words alone are not enough. I understand it takes time and genuine change.” It was announced that on June 5, 2020, Lifetime decided to sever ties with Miller as a result of the allegations of the racist remarks she made. The network canceled the Abby's Virtual Dance-Off competition reality series announced in April.

Spin-offs 
A spin-off series, Dance Moms: Miami, set in Miami, Florida, at Victor Smalley and Angel Armas' Stars Dance Studio, premiered on April 3, 2012, but was cancelled in September 2012.

A sister program titled Abby's Ultimate Dance Competition followed Miller and other dance professionals judging twelve young dancers aged 6–13 years on different styles of dance, hoping to find the most versatile dancer of the group. The series premiered on October 9, 2012, and ran for two seasons. Ray, Siwa, and Hilliker made their debuts on the show before joining the ALDC Elite Team on Dance Moms.

In 2014, Miller hosted another sister program titled Abby's Studio Rescue that followed Miller as she visited dance studios across the country to assist them to improve their choreography, studio decor, staff and other aspects. It premiered on June 24, 2014.

In July 2014, another spin-off titled Raising Asia starred Asia Monet Ray, a guest team member for several episodes of season 3 of Dance Moms. The show followed Ray, her model mom, bodybuilder dad and younger sister Bella Blu, helping Asia to pursue her dreams of fame in show business.

A British version of Dance Moms titled Dance Mums with Jennifer Ellison premiered on October 20, 2014, and ran for two seasons. Jennifer Ellison hosted the series, set at her Liverpool dance school, Jelli Studios. Dance Mums was produced by Shiver Productions.

In April 2020, it was announced that another spin-off Abby's Virtual Dance-Off would be set to debut during the summer of 2020. The 12-episode show would consist of taped submissions from dance contestants, with Miller judging via video conference, in keeping with social-distancing practiced during the coronavirus pandemic. However, Lifetime pulled the show on June 5, 2020, after two African-American mothers accused Miller of using racist and condescending language towards their daughters during previous seasons of Dance Moms.

Ellen DeGeneres is developing a film based on Dance Moms as of 2016.

See also 
 Dance Nation, a 2018 Pulitzer-nominated play by Clare Barron which is heavily inspired by the cast of Dance Moms

References

External links 
 
 Abby Lee Dance Company
 
 Candy Apples Dance Center
 Dance Moms on TVGuide.com

 
2010s American reality television series
2011 American television series debuts
2019 American television series endings
Dance competition television shows
Lifetime (TV network) original programming
English-language television shows
Obscenity controversies in television
Television controversies in the United States
Television series about children
Television series about teenagers
Television shows set in Ohio
Television shows set in Pittsburgh
Television shows filmed in Pittsburgh